Devotion (1931) is an American pre-Code romantic drama film starring Ann Harding and Leslie Howard based on the 1930 Pamela Wynne novel A Little Flat in the Temple. Its plot involves a woman who disguises herself and gains employment in the home of the man she loves.

Plot
Shirley Mortimer is the second daughter of a wealthy London family, who view her as plain and treat her as little more than a servant. When her father's friend David Trent visits, she becomes smitten. Upon hearing that he and his son are in need of a new domestic, she disguises herself as an elderly matron, Mrs. Halifax, and begins to work for him. He is a defense attorney, currently defending a man, painter Norman Harrington, on the charge of murdering his wife.

As Mrs. Halifax, Shirley wins the friendship of David's son and dotes on David, making sure he takes care of himself. David, for his part, begins to suspect that "Mrs. Halifax" is not who she claims. Harrington is acquitted, and upon meeting Mrs. Halifax asks to paint her portrait; while doing so, he realizes she is actually a young woman, but agrees to keep her secret.

After spending an evening with Shirley (out of disguise) and her father, David realizes who "Mrs. Halifax" is, and reveals to Shirley that he has fallen in love with her. Before they can begin their romance, however, David's estranged wife returns; assuming the worst, Shirley angrily leaves. She becomes a model for Harrington, who soon professes his own feelings, but rather than ask her to marry him, merely proposes that they travel the world together with Shirley as his mistress. Twice hurt, Shirley returns to her family home and her servant-like life there.

Both Harrington and David turn up at the Mortimer home; Harrington makes his plea, but upon hearing from David that he had not seen his wife for four years, and intends to swiftly divorce her, Shirley happily reunites with him.

Cast
Ann Harding as Shirley Mortimer
Leslie Howard as David Trent
Robert Williams as Norman Harrington
O.P. Heggie as Emmet Mortimer
Louise Closser Hale as Mrs. Mortimer
Dudley Digges as Sergeant Herbert Coggins
Alison Skipworth as Mrs. Matilda Coggins
Doris Lloyd as Pansy
Olive Tell as Mrs. Trent
Claude King as Arthur

Reception
According to RKO records the film lost $40,000 at the box office.

References

External links

1931 films
American romantic drama films
American black-and-white films
Films based on British novels
RKO Pictures films
1931 romantic drama films
Films directed by Robert Milton
Films set in London
Films scored by Arthur Lange
1930s English-language films
1930s American films